Kony Inc, a cloud-based provider of mobility, omnichannel and internet-of-things systems and services, was based in Austin, Texas with over 1600 employees worldwide. At the time of its sale to Temenos Group in 2019, 
Kony operated out of 11 offices in the US, UK, Germany, The Netherlands, Brazil, Mexico, India, Hong Kong, and Australia.

History 
Founded in 2007  the then-Orlando-based company released its first product, the KonyOne Platform in 2009. In 2012, Kony acquired Australian SAP consulting company Sky Technologies.

In March 2014, former executive vice president of software at HP, Thomas E. Hogan, was named CEO.

In May 2014, Kony announced a $50 million round of funding. Investors in the company include Softbank Capital, Hamilton Lane, Insight Venture Partners, Georgian Partners, Delta-v Capital and Telstra Ventures.

In June 2015, Kony moved its corporate headquarters from Orlando, Florida to Austin, Texas.

In June 2018, Kony launched Kony DBX, a digital banking platform and application suite.

In October 2018, Kony acquired Pivotus, Inc, a subsidiary of Umpqua Holdings.

In August 2019, Kony was acquired by Temenos Group, which has since subsumed Kony.

References

External links 
 Kony.com

Companies based in Austin, Texas
Software companies established in 2007
2007 establishments in Florida
Software companies based in Texas
Defunct software companies of the United States
Software companies disestablished in 2019
2019 disestablishments in Texas
2019 mergers and acquisitions